Mahfuzur Rahman was a judge of the High Court Division and a commissioner of the Election Commissioner of Bangladesh.

Early life 
Rahman was born on 1 February 1935 in Comilla to Khan Bahadur Siddiqur Rahman. He completed his bachelors of art and law from the University of Dhaka in 1959 and 1962 respectively.

Career 
Rahman became a lawyer of the Dhaka High Court in 1963.

In 1980, Rahman became a lawyer of the Appellate Division.

Rahman was appointed a judge of the High Court Division.

In 2001, Rahman was the judge of the Administrative Appellate Tribunal in 2001.

Rahman was appointed the election commissioner of Bangladesh Election Commission on 15 January 2006 by President Iajuddin Ahmed. In November he was the temporary Chief Election Commissioner of Bangladesh.

On 1 February 2007, Rahman and the other election commissioners resigned.

Death 
Rahman died on 5 May 2016 in Mohammadpur, Dhaka, Bangladesh.

References 

1935 births
2016 deaths
Bangladeshi judges
Supreme Court of Bangladesh justices
Bangladeshi lawyers
People from Comilla District
University of Dhaka alumni
Election Commission of Bangladesh